Olga Ivanovna Preobrazhenskaya (24 July 1881 – 30 October 1971) was a Russian actress and film director, one of the first female film directors, and the first female film director in Russia.

She is best known for directing the films Women of Ryazan (1927)  and And Quiet Flows the Don (1930).

Biography
Olga Ivanovna Preobrazhenskaya was born on 24 July 1881, in Moscow. From 1901 to 1904, she studied in the actor school of Moscow Art Theater. From 1905, she worked in theaters in Poltava, Tbilisi, Riga, Odessa, Voronezh and Moscow.

In 1913, she debuted as film actress in The Keys to Happiness, directed by Vladimir Gardin and Yakov Protazanov, and she starred in several popular adaptations of Russian classics, such as War and Peace and On the Eve (both 1915). Preobrazhenskaya was one of the founders of the actor school of the VGIK, where she taught from 1918 to 1925.

In 1916 Preobrazhenskaya directed Miss Peasant — it was her directorial debut. When it was released it received praise, but since it was the debut film of a woman director, it was treated with distrust, and on the posters and reviews her name was often written with a male ending or attributed to other directors.

After graduating from the Moscow Art Theater School in 1923 she worked as a director at the Goskino film studio (now Mosfilm), was the second director on the films Locksmith and Chancellor (1923). Starting in 1927, she collaborated with film director Ivan Pravov, with whom she made several films together. Their most well-known films were Women of Ryazan (1927) and And Quiet Flows the Don (1930)

Filmography
As Actress

As Director

References

External links

Actresses from the Russian Empire
Soviet women film directors
Soviet film directors
Soviet film actresses
Silent film directors
Actresses from Moscow
1881 births
1971 deaths